Tadiran Telecom (TTL) L.P.,  is a privately held Israeli Unified Communications and Collaboration (UC&C) company, providing UC&C systems globally. TTL is owned by Afcon Industries, which in turn is controlled by the Shlomo Group (TASE:SHLD), an Israeli corporation.

TTL's corporate headquarters are located in Petah Tikva (Israel), with regional offices located in Georgia (Atlanta), Beijing (China), and New Delhi (India).

The primary product offered by TTL is the Aeonix UC&C system.

References

Telecommunications companies of Israel
Telecommunications equipment vendors
Companies based in Petah Tikva
Telecommunications companies established in 1963
Israeli brands